Nabil El-Nayal, more commonly known as Nabil Nayal (born 1985 in Aleppo, Syria) is a Syrian-born British fashion designer. He moved to England at the age of 14 and has since gone on to win awards including the Royal Society of Arts Award, the Graduate Fashion Week 'Best Womenswear' Award and the British Fashion Council MA Scholarship Award.

Biography

Nabil El-Nayal, the designer behind ready-to-wear fashion brand Nabil Nayal, was born in Syria and moved to England at the age of 14. He went on to win many prestigious awards including the Royal Society of Arts Award, the Graduate Fashion Week 'Best Womenswear' Award and the British Fashion Council MA Scholarship Award; enabling him to study at the Royal College of Art.
Nabil’s obsession with Elizabethan craftsmanship has deeply informed his practice; seen through his use of pleats, dramatic construction and powerful silhouettes. Whilst this backdrop of historical references remains at the heart of the brand, Nabil is also conducting extensive research into ways in which these techniques can be applied, using the latest technologies. He was the first fashion designer in the world to use 3D printing in June 2010 and is currently undertaking a research doctorate in how 3D scanning can become integral to the design process.

In 2008 Nabil was invited by Christopher Bailey to work as ’Researcher Reporting to the Creative Director’ at Burberry Prorsum and in 2009 River Island commissioned Nabil to create a capsule collection which sold out in 3 days. Nabil’s entire MA collection was purchased by Harrods as part of the 2010 Harrods Launches platform and he was invited to the Buckingham Palace Reception for the British Clothing Industry where he met Queen Elizabeth II. At this time Nabil worked alongside David Sassoon as Assistant Designer at Bellville Sassoon and in 2011 Nabil made his London Fashion Week debut as a semi-finalist in Colin McDowell's Fashion Fringe competition, attracting high-profile supporters such as Claudia Schiffer, Lady Gaga, Florence Welch & Rihanna.
In February 2015 Nabil was shortlisted for the LVMH Prize and invited to show at Paris Fashion Week and in July he showed a collection to private clients at the 2015 Haute Couture Paris Fashion Week. Here Nabil's talent and devotion to his craft were applauded by Sarah Mower (Contributing Editor to American Vogue), Delphine Arnault (Executive Vice President, Louis Vuitton), Nicolas Ghesquiere (Creative Director, Louis Vuitton) and Karl Lagerfeld, who upon seeing the collection exclaimed “I love it! I love it! I love it!” and bought, what has since become affectionately named 'The Karl Shirt', for his collaborator Amanda Harlech. In February 2016, Lagerfeld continued to show his support for the brand, photographing Jerry Hall in Nabil's pieces as part of V Magazine’s V100 issue. Nabil was an LVMH Prize finalist in June 2017 and was invited to present his work at the Louis Vuitton Foundation in Paris.

In July 2016 the National Museum of Scotland revealed a collaboration with Nabil Nayal, featuring two pieces from the SS16 collection alongside a host of designers to form part of a new permanent exhibition dedicated to international fashion and textiles. In September 2017, Nabil designed an exclusive piece for Lorde’s Melodrama world tour. In May 2018, NABIL NAYAL was announced as a recipient of the British Fashion Council, Fashion Trust Grant that offers business support through financial grants and mentoring to promising British designers.

In July 2018, Nabil graduated with a PhD in Fashion from Manchester Metropolitan University, Fashion Institute. His thesis was titled ‘Disruption as a Generative Principle in Fashion Design. The ‘Elizabethan Sportswear’ Collections of Nabil Nayal’.In September 2018 the brand delivered their debut presentation on the official London Fashion Week schedule and made history by becoming the first brand to host a LFW show at the British Library. The SS19 collection incorporated rare Elizabethan archives into the collection, including the Tilbury speech by Elizabeth I. In February 2019, the brand's showed their AW19 collection at London Fashion Week, with inspiration from Marie Antoinette.

In April 2019, 'The Library Collection' launched at Selfridges London. In May 2019, NABIL NAYAL was, again, a recipient of the 2019 BFC Fashion Trust Grant.

Notable clients
His clothes are worn by celebrities such as Florence Welch, Lady Gaga, Rihanna, Claudia Schiffer Victoria Beckham, and Lorde. Karl Lagerfeld commissioned Nabil to make a shirt for his muse and collaborator Amanda Harlech, who then styled and photographed Jerry Hall wearing it for the V Magazine 100 issue.

Awards
El-Nayal has received awards including:
 Royal Society of Arts Award 2008
 Graduate Fashion Week 'Best Womenswear' Award 2008
 British Fashion Council MA Scholarship Award – for the Royal College of Art 2008
 Crown Paint 2009 (interior design competition)
 Harrods Launches 2010
 Fashion Fringe Semi-Finalist 2011
 LVMH Prize shortlist 2015
 LVMH Prize finalist 2017 
BFC Fashion Trust Grant and Mentoring 2019

References

Living people
People from Aleppo
1985 births
Alumni of the Royal College of Art
Syrian fashion designers
British fashion designers
Syrian emigrants to the United Kingdom